The Laubierinidae are a family of sea snails, marine gastropod molluscs in the clade Littorinimorpha.

Taxonomy 

The family includes the following genera:
 Akibumia Kuroda & Habe, 1959
 Laminilabrum Kuroda & Habe, 1961
 Laubierina A. Warén & Ph. Bouchet, 1990
 Pisanianura Rovereto, 1899
Genera brought into synonymy
 Anura Bellardi, 1873 † : synonym of Pisanianura Rovereto, 1899 (invalid: junior homonym of Anura Hodgson, 1841 [Aves]; Pisanianura is a replacement name)
 Kaiparanura Laws, 1944 †: synonym of Pisanianura Rovereto, 1899
 Nawenia Ladd, 1977 † : synonym of Pisanianura Rovereto, 1899

References

External links
 The Taxonomicon
 Warén, A.; Bouchet, P. (1990). Laubierinidae and Pisanianurinae (Ranellidae), two new deep-sea taxa of the Tonnoidea (Gastropoda: Prosobranchia). Veliger. 33(1): 56-102